McLeod Lake, formerly named Carson Lake, is a lake in central Alberta, Canada within Woodlands County. Carson-Pegasus Provincial Park surrounds McLeod Lake and nearby Little McLeod Lake to the northeast.

Camping 
Carson-Pegasus Provincial Park at McLeod Lake includes a campground featuring 182 campsites, day use sites, and a group use site, and offers winter camping.

Recreation 
Other recreational activities at the provincial park and lake include bird-watching, canoeing/kayaking, cross-country skiing, fishing, hiking, horseshoes, ice fishing, power boating, snowmobiling (off-site), swimming, and wildlife viewing.

Fish species 
Fish species in McLeod Lake include rainbow trout.

References 

McLeod Lake
Woodlands County